Sinseonbong is an 845-metre-high mountain of South Korea.

See also
List of mountains of Korea

References

Mountains of South Korea
Mountains of North Chungcheong Province